Sunyer (Catalan) or Suñer/Suniario (Spanish), from Latin Suniarius, possibly from Proto-Germanic *sunjō ("truth, protest"), may refer to:
Sunyer, Count of Barcelona (870–950)
Sunyer I of Empúries (834–848)
Sunyer II of Empúries (862–915)
Sunyer I of Pallars (948–1010)
Joaquim Sunyer (1874–1956), Catalan artist

See also
Sunyer, Lleida, a municipality in the comarca of Segrià, Catalonia

Catalan-language surnames